Pentastelma is a genus of liana in family Apocynaceae, first published as a genus in 1974. It contains only one known species, Pentastelma auritum, endemic to the Island of Hainan in China.

The species is listed as critically endangered.

References

Asclepiadoideae
Endemic flora of China
Monotypic Apocynaceae genera
Critically endangered plants
Taxonomy articles created by Polbot